PDRC may refer to:
 Passive daytime radiative cooling, a solar radiation management strategy to reverse global warming.
 People's Democratic Reform Committee, a political pressure group in the 2013–14 Thai political crisis.
 Puntland Development Research Center, a local non-governmental organization in Puntland, Somalia.